My Reflection is the sixth video album by Japanese recording artist Mai Kuraki. It was released on DVD format on January 7, 2004 by B-Vision. The album consists of two discs: disc one includes Kuraki's music videos and making videos, while disc two includes materials from recordings from Kuraki's concerts during her Mai Kuraki Fairy Tale Tour 02-03 and other performances. The album was originally scheduled to be released on December 24, 2003; however, it was delayed for a technical reason.

Upon its release, My Reflection met with a commercial success, debuting atop on the Oricon Weekly Video Albums Chart. The album became the twelfth best-selling video album (DVD) of 2004 in Japan.

Track listing

Charts

Weekly charts

Yearly charts

References

2004 video albums
Mai Kuraki albums